The Heart of the Matter is a 1948 novel by Graham Greene.

The Heart of the Matter or Heart of the Matter may also refer to:

Film and television
The Heart of the Matter (film), a 1953 film based on the Graham Greene book
Heart of the Matter (TV series), a British television debate series
 "The Heart of the Matter" (Grey's Anatomy), a television episode
 "Heart of the Matter" (Once Upon a Time in Wonderland), a television episode

Music
The Heart of the Matter (Kenny Rogers album), 1985
The Heart of the Matter (Triosphere album), 2014
Heart of the Matter (EP), a 2004 EP by The Screaming Jets
"The Heart of the Matter" (song), a song by Don Henley

Other uses
Heart of the Matter, a 2010 novel by Emily Giffin
The Heart of the Matter, a report and film for The Commission on the Humanities and Social Sciences

See also
Matters of the Heart (disambiguation)